Herschel Davis Newsom (born May 1, 1905) was the 16th master of the National Grange (1950–1968), a foundation that promotes education, service and legislation in benefit of American farm families. He graduated from Indiana University with a B.A. in chemistry in 1926 and earned the university's Distinguished Alumni award in 1960. He has held appointments from President Truman, President Eisenhower, and President Kennedy such as Citizens' Commission on International Cooperation, President's Rural Safety Council, and Citizens' Committee for International Development. He was elected President of the International Federation of Agricultural Producers (IFAP) in 1963 as well as held several Presidential appointments to advisory positions, including the Committee on Trade Negotiations. In 1964, he founded the Grange Foundation. In 1968 he was appointed by Lyndon Johnson to the U.S. Tariff Commission. He died on July 2, 1970, in Washington, D.C.

References

External links
 Photo on Getty Images
 Interview at John F Kennedy library
 Senate Hearings Downloads

1905 births
1970 deaths
Indiana University alumni
American activists
Place of birth missing